The Big League World Series (BLWS) Central Region was one of five United States regions that sent teams to the World Series. The Big League division was discontinued by Little League Baseball after the 2016 BLWS. The region's participation in the BLWS had dated back to 1968, when it was known as the North Region.

Central Region States

Region Champions

Results by state

See also

Central Region in other Little League divisions
Little League – Central 1957-2000
Little League – Great Lakes
Little League – Midwest
Intermediate League
Junior League
Senior League

References

Central
Big League World Series
Sports in the Midwestern United States